
Gmina Radomin is a rural gmina (administrative district) in Golub-Dobrzyń County, Kuyavian-Pomeranian Voivodeship, in north-central Poland.

Villages
Gmina Radomin contains the villages and settlements of Bocheniec, Dulsk, Dulsk-Frankowo, Gaj, Jakubkowo, Kamionka, Łubki, Piórkowo, Płonko, Płonne, Radomin, Rętwiny, Rodzone, Spiczyny, Szafarnia, Szczutowo, Wilczewko and Wilczewo.

Neighbouring gminas
Gmina Radomin is bordered by the gminas of Brzuze, Golub-Dobrzyń, Wąpielsk and Zbójno.

References
Polish official population figures 2006

Radomin
Golub-Dobrzyń County